The Erich Fromm Prize is a German prize bestowed upon people who have advanced Humanism through their scientific, social, sociopolitical or journalistic engagement. The prize is named after Erich Fromm, a Jewish German-American philosopher, psychoanalyst and psychologist. The prize is conferred yearly since 1995, and since 2006, it is endowed with 10,000 €.

The Erich Fromm Society (Erich-Fromm-Gesellschaft) elects a five-person jury, which decides on the prize winner. Its decision is made by simple majority and is not influenced by the Society, but it has to respect applications and recommendations.

Recipients 
Source:

1995
Duchovný Parliament, Bratislava
1996 
Sociopsychoanalytical Seminary of the University of Mexiko-City
University of Wrocław, Poland
Germanistic Division of the University of Pécs, Hungary
1997: No prize winner
1998
Rainer J. Kaus
Svante Lundgren
Martina Parge
1999
Jan M. Böhm
Claudia Hoock
2000
Kevin Anderson
Richard Quinney
Bruno Osuch
2001
Gerd Meyer
2002–2003: No prize winners
2004 William Wasson, Hamid Lechhab
2005: No prize winner
2006 Hans Leyendecker, Heribert Prantl
2007 Eugen Drewermann, Konstantin Wecker
2008 Jakob von Uexküll
2009 Gerhart Baum
 2010 Noam Chomsky
 2011 Anne-Sophie Mutter
 2012 Georg Schramm
 2013 Gesine Schwan
 2015 Götz Werner
 2016 Christel und Rupert Neudeck
 2017 John Neumeier
 2018 Hartmut Rosa
 2019 Daniel and Sabine Röder and Pulse of Europe
 2020 Paul Mason
 2021 Maja Göpel
 2022

References

External links 
 

German literary awards